The 2011 William & Mary Tribe football team represented The College of William & Mary in the 2011 NCAA Division I FCS football season. The Tribe were led by 32nd year head coach Jimmye Laycock and played their home games at Zable Stadium. They are a member of the Colonial Athletic Association. They finished the season 5–6, 3–5 in CAA play to finish in seventh place.

Schedule

References

William and Mary
William & Mary Tribe football seasons
William and Mary Tribe football team